William Kelly (1840 – 19 September 1907) was an Irish migrant to New Zealand, and became a businessman, soldier and politician.

Early life
Kelly was born in 1840 in County Louth, Ireland, and emigrated to New Zealand as a young man in 1863. In 1864 he became a contractor for the troops stationed in Auckland, then in the following year went to Ōpōtiki and set up a shipping business between Ōpōtiki and Auckland. In 1868 he became captain of the Bay of Plenty cavalry corps and fought in the New Zealand Wars.

Political career

He was a member of Auckland Provincial Council, representing the Pensioner Settlements (18 November 1872 – 3 October 1873) and Opotiki (18 November 1873 – 31 October 1876) electorates. In 1871, he was elected to the House of Representatives for the East Coast electorate. He held that seat until the end of the parliamentary term in 1875. The "most sensational electoral contest ever held in the East Coast" electorate was held in January 1876, when mysterious pieces of cardboard were distributed by supporters of George Read in Gisborne, which hotel bars accepted as legal tender. Read, George Morris and Kelly received 215, 206 and 185 votes, with another candidate coming a distant fourth. Morris petitioned against Read's election. A parliamentary committee of enquiry determined that Read had not broken any laws by approving the initiative, but the House of Representatives resolved that Read was to be unseated in favour of Morris, which happened later in 1876. This was the last election enquiry held by a parliamentary committee. Subsequently, these enquiries were held by the courts.

The  in the newly formed  electorate was hotly contested. Four candidates were nominated: Kelly; George Morris, who had previously represented the  electorate; George Vesey Stewart, then the owner of the Bay of Plenty Times; and Henry Thomas Rowe, a surveyor and commission agent. Rowe announced his retirement from the contest on 6 December three days out from election day, urging his supporters to vote for Stewart instead. The unofficial results were released the day after the election (Saturday, 10 December) and Morris had a majority of 13 votes over Stewart, with the official declaration to be made on 12 December. This was deferred until 14 December, with Morris ahead by 10 votes. Stewart stood for the Tauranga mayoralty a few months later and was elected the town's first mayor.

After a break from politics, he was returned as an MP in 1887
for the Tauranga electorate. In the following election in 1890, he was again returned in the East Coast electorate. In 1893, he was successful in the Bay of Plenty electorate, but he was defeated there in 1896 by William Herries. In 1897 he was called to the New Zealand Legislative Council.

Notes

References

1840 births
1907 deaths
Members of the New Zealand Legislative Council
Members of the Auckland Provincial Council
Members of the New Zealand House of Representatives
Irish emigrants to New Zealand (before 1923)
People of the New Zealand Wars
Politicians from County Louth
Unsuccessful candidates in the 1875–1876 New Zealand general election
Unsuccessful candidates in the 1881 New Zealand general election
Unsuccessful candidates in the 1884 New Zealand general election
New Zealand MPs for North Island electorates
19th-century New Zealand politicians